

111001–111100 

|-bgcolor=#f2f2f2
| colspan=4 align=center | 
|}

111101–111200 

|-bgcolor=#f2f2f2
| colspan=4 align=center | 
|}

111201–111300 

|-bgcolor=#f2f2f2
| colspan=4 align=center | 
|}

111301–111400 

|-bgcolor=#f2f2f2
| colspan=4 align=center | 
|}

111401–111500 

|-id=468
| 111468 Alba Regia ||  || Alba Regia, "White Region", the Roman name of the Hungarian town of Székesfehérvár, birthplace of the second discoverer || 
|}

111501–111600 

|-id=558
| 111558 Barrett || 2002 AZ || Michael Barrett (born 1955), American amateur astronomer and eclipse chaser || 
|-id=561
| 111561 Giovanniallevi ||  || Giovanni Allevi (born 1969) is an Italian piano soloist and composer of contemporary music. || 
|-id=570
| 111570 Ágasvár ||  || Ágasvár, a 635 m peak in the Mátra Mountains, and its Ágasvár hostel, a mountain station of Hungarian amateur astronomers || 
|-id=571
| 111571 Bebevio ||  || Beatrice Vio (born 1997), better known as "Bebe Vio", is an Italian wheelchair fencer who won the European championship (2014 and 2016), World championship (2015 and 2017), and Paralympic games (2016 and 2020) in the foil B category. || 
|-id=594
| 111594 Ráktanya ||  || Ráktanya, a famed hostel in the Bakony Mountains in Hungary || 
|}

111601–111700 

|-id=660
| 111660 Jimgray ||  || Jim Gray (1944–2007), an American computer scientist who received the Turing Award in 1998 || 
|-id=661
| 111661 Mamiegeorge || 2002 BP || Mamie George (1877–1971) and Albert George (1873–1955), husband and wife, founded the George Foundation in 1945 to promote the future of Fort Bend County, Texas || 
|-id=696
| 111696 Helenorman ||  || Helen Belton Orman (1938–2004), American professor and artist || 
|}

111701–111800 

|-bgcolor=#f2f2f2
| colspan=4 align=center | 
|}

111801–111900 

|-id=818
| 111818 Deforest || 2002 DT || Craig Edward DeForest (born 1968), an American solar physicist || 
|}

111901–112000 

|-id=913
| 111913 Davidgans || 2002 GD || David Gans (1541–1613), a Jewish chronicler, mathematician, geographer and astronomer || 
|}

References 

111001-112000